In the 2013–14 season, MC Oran competed in the Ligue 1 for the 48th season, as well as the Algerian Cup.

Pre-season and friendlies

Competitions

Overview

{| class="wikitable" style="text-align: center"
|-
!rowspan=2|Competition
!colspan=8|Record
!rowspan=2|Started round
!rowspan=2|Final position / round
!rowspan=2|First match	
!rowspan=2|Last match
|-
!
!
!
!
!
!
!
!
|-
| Ligue 1

|  
| 13th
| 24 August 2013
| 22 May 2014
|-
| Algerian Cup

| Round of 64 
| Quarter-final
| 6 December 2013
| 18 February 2014
|-
! Total

Ligue 1

League table

Results summary

Results by round

Matches

Algerian Cup

Squad information

Playing statistics

|-
! colspan=10 style=background:#dcdcdc; text-align:center| Goalkeepers

|-
! colspan=10 style=background:#dcdcdc; text-align:center| Defenders

|-
! colspan=10 style=background:#dcdcdc; text-align:center| Midfielders

|-
! colspan=10 style=background:#dcdcdc; text-align:center| Forwards

|-
! colspan=10 style=background:#dcdcdc; text-align:center| Players transferred out during the season

Goalscorers

Suspensions

Players

Transfers

In

Summer

Winter

Out

Summer

Winter

References

External links
 2013–14 MC Oran season at dzfoot.com 

MC Oran seasons
Algerian football clubs 2013–14 season